Under the Sunset is a collection of short stories by Bram Stoker (the author of Dracula), first published in 1881. It was illustrated by W. V. Cockburn and William FitzGerald, the younger brother of the Dublin physicist George Francis FitzGerald.

Its significance in the development of fantasy literature was recognized by its republication in October 1978 by the Newcastle Publishing Company as the seventeenth volume of the celebrated Newcastle Forgotten Fantasy Library series.

The stories in the collection are:

"Under the Sunset"
"The Rose Prince"
"The Invisible Giant"
"The Shadow Builder"
"How 7 Went Mad"
"Lies and Lilies"
"The Castle of the King"
"The Wondrous Child"

"The Shadow Builder" was adapted to film in 1998 as Shadow Builder.

External links 

 Bram Stoker Online Full text and PDF versions of the entire collection.
 

1881 short story collections
Fantasy short story collections
Short story collections by Bram Stoker